The MAS Electronic Payment System or MEPS in short, is a SGD-only online interbank payment and fund transfer system in Singapore. It went online in July 1998, and is owned and operated by the Monetary Authority of Singapore (MAS). The irrevocable transfer of funds and the real-time nature of transfers are some of the key features of MEPS.

See also 
 Banking in Singapore

References 

Payment systems
Banking in Singapore
Interbank networks